The Blastocladiaceae are a family of fungi in the division Blastocladiomycota. It contains the following genera:

 Allomyces
 Blastocladiella
 Blastocladia
 Blastocladiopsis
 Microallomyces

The family was circumscribed by Henning Eiler Petersen in 1909.

References

External links

Blastocladiomycota
Aquatic fungi
Fungus families